Jeon Tae-il (28 September 1948 – 13 November 1970) was a South Korean sewing worker and workers' rights activist who committed suicide by self-immolation at the age of 22 in protest at the poor working conditions of South Korean factories during fourth Republic era. His death brought attention to the substandard labor conditions and helped the formation of labor union movement in South Korea.

Early life 
Jeon Tae-il was born on 28 September 1948. He was the son of Jeon Sang-soo, a poor worker in Namsan-dong, Daegu, and his wife, Lee So-sun. At one time, his father, Jeon Sang-soo, also tried his hand at the domestic water industry, but failed repeatedly. His maternal grandfather was killed by a Japanese police officer on charges of joining the anti-Japanese independence movement. In 1954, he and his family members came to Seoul, but were homeless under the Yeomcheon Bridge near Seoul Station. His mother begged in Manni-dong while Jeon Tae-il's father, who did sewing work, got a job, so the family could live in a monthly rental room.

However, the family returned to Daegu in 1960. He did not finish elementary school. After that, he had an underprivileged childhood with little formal education and began peddling on the street to live. In March 1963, he entered Cheong-ok High School in Daegu, but due to family circumstances, he dropped out of school during his first year in December of that year. His father, Jeon Sang-soo, forced his son to drop out of school to do sewing work at home. He was frustrated that he couldn't go to school and he ran away from home and returned home in three days. His father said that he had to earn money to study, and kicked him and beat him, forcing him to leave school.

Youth 
He learned to sew from his father, but he ran away from home again with his younger brother in 1964 and went to Seoul. He peddled at Dongdaemun Market, delivered newspaper, and did other small labour work such as shoe polishing. He was employed as an assistant at the Seoul Peace Market's clothing store by the sewing skills that he learned from his father. He worked for 14 hours and was paid 50 won per day for a cup of tea. When he turned 17, he became a sida ("chore" in Korean) at Sam-il sa in the Peace Market and soon became a tailor .

Worker's Human Rights Movement 
As a tailor, Jeon witnessed the horrendous working conditions in the Seoul Peace Market. Such conditions included rampant tuberculosis due to poor ventilation (or the lack thereof) in the sweatshops, and the enforced injections of amphetamines to keep sleep-deprived workers awake and to work them overtime without proper compensation.

In 1968 he noticed that there was a work standard law that is law to protect workers' human rights. After that he bought manual of work standard law and studied by that. While studying the contents of the law, he was angry at the reality that even the minimum working conditions prescribed by law were not observed. In June 1969, he founded the Fool's Association (바보회), the first labor movement organization in the Peace Market. The name "Fool's Association" reflects Jeon Tae-il's thoughts as a worker. Rather than struggling to argue that workers also have human rights, his point were that they were fools who conform to an exploitative working environment. He informed the workers of the Peace Market the contents of the Labor Standards Act and unfairness of their current working conditions. Also, he surveyed the current status of work through a questionnaire.

Also, protesting against such was, by association, protesting against the oppressive rule of Park Chung-hee, South Korea's then-dictator president. Although Jeon succeeded in briefly creating awareness, he soon met with resistance from the government, which almost entirely ignored labor regulations and frequently sided with the employers who were accused of exploitation. Scornful Labor Department officials told Jeon and his colleagues they were unpatriotic for complaining, and employers simply cracked down harder.

Death 
Ultimately, in order to force attention onto the issue he set himself on fire and ran through the streets of downtown Seoul shouting slogans such as, "We workers are human beings, too!" "Guarantee the Three Basic Labor Rights," and "Do not let my death be in vain". He was transported to a nearby hospital but did not survive the wounds suffered from burning himself.

Jeon Tae-il received emergency treatment but his body was not able to stretch out because it was too hard. Jeon Tae-il left a testament to his mother, Lee So-sun, "Mother, please do something I could not do." Jeon Tae-il's mother took off her apron to cover her shivering son and went to the doctor. Doctors told her that the injection to relieve her son's burns would cost 15,000 won, but she replied that she could not pay that amount. At around 4 pm, he was taken by ambulance and sent back to the emergency room at St. Mary's Hospital in Seoul, where he died in the emergency room at 10 pm on 13 November. At St. Mary's Hospital, Jeon Tae-il was left in the emergency room for some time before moving to the hospital. The doctor diagnosed that there is no hope for recovery.

Legacy 

His death mobilized and motivated workers to take up the struggle, and this eventually led to the creation of labor unions that were gradually able to secure workers' rights. Also, his death became a catalyst for uniting many university students, some religious officials, and the newspaper media, which continuously silenced their support for the cause of the workers. 

The biographic film A Single Spark details Jeon's struggle. A bestselling biography of him was published in 2001.

The 2012 Documentary film Mother tells the story of Jeon's mother, Lee So-Sun.

In April 2012, his younger sister, Jeon Soon-ok, was elected a member of National Assembly of South Korea, as a member of Democratic United Party.

Since the beginning of the first anniversary ceremony of Jeon Tae-il, a Christian youth in 1972, the title has changed to the commemoration ceremony of the labor activist Jeon Tae-il in the 1980s. His mother, Lee So-sun, was called the mother of workers by devoting herself to supporting the Cheonggyecheon union and supporting the labor movement until her death. In 1984, the Jeon Tae-il Commemorative Project was organized in Seoul, centered around labor activists and in 1985, the Jeon Tae-il Memorial Hall was opened. Afterwards, the Jeon Tae-il Foundation was organized to start awarding the Jeon Tae-il Literary Award and the Jeon Tae-il Labor Award. After the June Struggle in 1987, labor groups gathered and held workers' meetings from July to August of that year. On 15 July, the '87 Declaration of the Liberation of the Working Class' was held in reference to his commentary. In November 1988, a national workers' meeting was held in Seoul to commemorate Jeon Tae-il's self-immolation and is held every November. In 2001, Jeon Tae-il was approved as a member of the democratization movement. On 19 September 1996, Jeon Tae-il Street was created in Euljiro 6-ga, Jung-gu, Seoul. In commemoration of this, a memorial performance was held in front of a painting containing the image of Jeon Tae-il's self-immolation. In this Jeon Tae-il Street','Jeon Tae-il Street Cultural Festival' is held to commemorate Jeon Tae-il.

The labor world 
After his suicide, the Cloth Workers' Union was formed in the peace market, and other factories also could get the opportunity to form a union. The case that Jeon Tae-il died while shouting that workers are people, not machines, greatly influenced the working world and became the starting point of a full-fledged labor movement. Workers who had suffered from the exploitation and termination of the company but did not intend to struggle, awakened after Jeon Tae-il's death.

Different reactions of the peace market 
The boss of a company in the peace market said he was worried about being investigated because of Jeon Tae-il's death. The boss said later, "If Jeon Tae-il worked at our factory, it would be a really big problem.". Some workers were cynical about his death. Some workers even said that "Jeon's death can't make any change of worker's right.". At that time, some workers who did not receive proper education did not care about Jeon's death.

Social reaction 
His death, which accused the lives of workers who were not respected for basic human rights, had a great social impact. On 16 November, more than 100 law students at Seoul National University claimed to receive his body and to perform a funeral and more than 400 students engaged indefinite fasting protests. On 20 November, students from Seoul National University, Sungkyunkwan University, and Ewha Womans University and other student activists from Seoul gathered to hold a memorial ceremony for Jeon Tae-il at Seoul National University Law School and held a demonstration. Korea University and Yonsei University students also participated in the rally. After the protests, Seoul National University issued an indefinite suspension of business, but Seoul National University students continued to engage in vigils.

On the 22nd, about 40 college students at Sae moon-an Church held a fasting prayer for the Atonement saying that society is responsible for the death of Jeon Tae-il and that they are also conspirators. On the 23rd, Christianity held a memorial service in collaboration with Protestantism and Catholicism.

At that time, Kim Dae-jung, a candidate for the president of the New Democratic Party, also announced at the press conference on 23 January 1971, "Implementation of the spirit of Jeon Tae-il" as a pledge. Since then, the New Democratic Party has developed a policy of favor for the labor movement and protesters often took refuge in the New People's Party, avoiding oppression by the police and government.

On 14 October 2020, "The Jeon Tae-il Memorial Month" was proclaimed about a month ahead of the 50th anniversary of Jeon Tae-il's death. World-renowned digital media artist Hooranky Bae unveiled a digital art work with the motif of Jeon Tae-il's passion with the Jeon Tae-il 50th Anniversary Event Committee at the proclamation ceremony held at Jeon Tae-il Bridge in Jongno-gu, Seoul on the 14th. In an interview with Yonhap News, He said, "It's a great impression. He's a martyr who goes beyond human limits."

References

External links
 전태일재단
 전태일 "어느 청년 재단사의 꿈"

1948 births
1970 suicides
South Korean human rights activists
Korean trade unionists
South Korean humanitarians
Suicides by self-immolation in South Korea